Lamorran is a village  southeast of Truro in Cornwall, England. Lamorran lies within the Cornwall Area of Outstanding Natural Beauty (AONB).

Lamorran church was built in the mid-13th century and has never been enlarged. It was dedicated (to St Morenna) in 1261 and restored unsympathetically in 1845 (by William White) and 1853 (for Lord Falmouth; Evelyn Boscawen, 6th Viscount Falmouth (1819–1889)). The tower is separate from the church and the font of Catacleuse stone may be Norman (or 15th century work in the Norman style).

A large monument of 1658 commemorates John Verman and his wife. The churchyard cross is a fine example of a Gothic stone cross. This cross is made of Pentewan stone; the crosshead is now incomplete as the upper limb is missing.

Lamorran was an ancient parish, and became a civil parish in 1866. The civil parish was abolished in 1934 and absorbed into the civil parish of St Michael Penkevil. For ecclesiastical purposes the parish is now united with Merther to form the parish of Lamorran and Merther.

Notable residents
The naval commander Robert Carthew Reynolds was born at Lamorran: he had a long and distinguished career in the Royal Navy and died at sea on the coast of Denmark. Owen Fitzpen (also known as Owen Phippen) was an English merchant taken captive by Barbary pirates who later mounted a heroic escape; he afterwards lived at Lamorran.

References

Villages in Cornwall
Former civil parishes in Cornwall